Rashawn Dally (born 14 January 1997) is a Jamaican professional footballer who plays as a winger for Memphis 901 in the USL Championship.

Career

Early career
Dally played varsity soccer at Watkinson School followed by four years of college soccer at Quinnipiac University between 2015 and 2018, making 78 appearances, scoring 16 goals and tallying 15 assists.

While at college, Dally appeared for USL PDL sides AC Connecticut, Myrtle Beach Mutiny, FC Golden State Force, and National Premier Soccer League side Hartford City FC.

Professional
On 14 January 2019, Dally was selected 49th overall in the 2019 MLS SuperDraft by FC Cincinnati. He signed with the club on 28 February 2019.

On 5 March 2019, Dally was loaned to USL Championship side Memphis 901 for their 2019 season.

Dally was loaned out again on 8 July 2020 to USL Championship side Las Vegas Lights.

He was released by Cincinnati at the end of their 2020 season.

In April 2021, Dally returned to Memphis 901 FC, signing a contract with the club ahead of the 2021 season.

On January 13, 2022, Dally signed for USL Championship club Hartford Athletic.

On March 7, 2023, Dally returned again to Memphis 901 for this third spell at the club.

International
Dally represents Jamaica internationally, having appeared for the nation at the under-17 and under-20 levels. He was called in to the senior national team training camp in March 2018.

References

External links
FC Cincinnati player profile
Quinnipiac player profile

1997 births
Living people
AC Connecticut players
American people of Jamaican descent
American soccer players
Association football forwards
FC Cincinnati draft picks
FC Cincinnati players
FC Golden State Force players
Hartford Athletic players
Jamaica international footballers
Jamaica under-20 international footballers
Jamaica youth international footballers
Jamaican footballers
Las Vegas Lights FC players
Memphis 901 FC players
Myrtle Beach Mutiny players
People from Bloomfield, Connecticut
Quinnipiac Bobcats men's soccer players
Soccer players from Connecticut
Sportspeople from Hartford County, Connecticut
USL Championship players
USL League Two players
Major League Soccer players